This article lists applications and other software implementations using the PKCS #11 standard.

Applications
 FreeOTFE – disk encryption system (PKCS #11 can either be used to encrypt critical data block, or as keyfile storage)
 Mozilla Firefox – a web browser
 Mozilla Thunderbird – an email client
 OpenDNSSEC – a DNSSEC signer
 OpenSSL – TLS/SSL library (with engine_pkcs11)
 GnuTLS – TLS/SSL library
 Network Security Services library developed by Mozilla
 OpenVPN – VPN system
 StrongSwan – VPN system
 TrueCrypt – disk encryption system (PKCS #11 only used as trivial keyfile storage)
 TrouSerS – an open-source TCG Software Stack
 OpenSC – smartcard library
 OpenSSH – a Secure Shell implementation (since OpenSSH version 5.4)
 OpenDS – an open source directory server.
 Oracle Database – uses PKCS#11 for transparent data encryption
 IBM DB2 Database – uses PKCS#11 for transparent data encryption
 PowerDNS – open source, authoritative DNS server (since version 3.4.0)
 GNOME Keyring – a password and cryptographic key manager.
 Solaris Cryptographic Framework – pluggable cryptographic system in operating system
 Safelayer – KeyOne and TrustedX product suites.
 Pkcs11Admin – GUI tool for administration of PKCS#11 enabled devices
 SoftHSM – implementation of a cryptographic store accessible through a PKCS#11 interface
 XCA – X Certificate and Key management
 SecureCRT – SSH client
 wolfSSL – an SSL/TLS library with PKCS #11 support
 XShell - SSH Client from NetSarang Computer, Inc (versions > 6.0 support PKCS#11)
 EJBCA – Certification Authority software (uses PKCS#11 for digital signatures)
 SignServer – Server side software for digitally signing and time stamping documents, files and code (uses PKCS#11 for digital signatures and key wrapping/unwrapping)
 PuTTY-CAC - A fork of PuTTY that supports smartcard authentication
 Bloombase StoreSafe – Data-at-rest encryption software appliance with PKCS#11 support for external key management

PKCS #11 wrappers 
Since PKCS #11 is a complex C API many wrappers exist that let the developer use the API from various languages.
 For Perl:
 Crypt::PKCS11
 Crypt::NSS::PKCS11
 Crypt::PKCS11::Easy
 Crypt::Cryptoki
 php-pkcs11 PHP PKCS11 Extension including the support of the Oasis PKCS11 standard
 NCryptoki - .NET (C# and VB.NET), Silverlight 5 and Visual Basic 6 wrapper for PKCS #11 API
 Pkcs11Interop - Open source .NET wrapper for unmanaged PKCS#11 libraries
 python-pkcs11 - The most complete and documented PKCS#11 wrapper for Python
 PyKCS11 - Another wrapper for Python
 pkcs11 - Another wrapper for Python
 Java includes a wrapper for PKCS #11 API since version 1.5
 IAIK PKCS#11 Wrapperon GitHub - A library for the Java™ platform which makes PKCS#11 modules accessible from within Java.
 pkcs11-helper - A simple open source C interface to handle PKCS #11 tokens.
 SDeanComponents - Delphi wrapper for PKCS #11 API
 jacknji11 - Java wrapper using Java Native Access (JNA)
 rust-cryptoki - High-level, Rust idiomatic wrapper crate for PKCS #11.
 rust-pkcs11 - Crate for Rust
 ruby-pkcs11 - Ruby binding for PKCS #11 API
 tclPKCS11 = Tcl binding for PKCS#11 API
 pkcs11.net - .NET wrapper for PKCS #11 API
 Oracle Solaris Cryptographic Framework
 pkcs11 - Go wrapper for PKCS #11 API
 node.js
 graphene - high level OOP wrapper for pkcs#11
 pkcs11js - low level wrapper for pkcs#11

References 

Lists of software
Cryptography lists and comparisons